List of songs by Melvin Van Peebles, by album, song title, year.

Works by Melvin Van Peebles
Van Peebles